Hoffman's Chocolates is a manufacturer of chocolates in Florida. The business is based in Greenacres, Florida and includes several retail locations in South Florida. Established in 1975, Hoffman's is the largest manufacturer of chocolate in Florida. 

Hoffman's has been a favorite local brand for residents of Palm Beach County and is especially popular with the substantial Jewish population as a source of Kosher O-U chocolates 

Randall Vitale is the President of Hoffman's Chocolates.  

The Hoffman's Chocolates factory is a tourist destination that includes at 30 ft observation window of operations. The company makes elaborate December holiday displays and offers products such as gift baskets and chocolate covered pretzels. Offerings include the "Snoodle" and Pecan Caramel "Jitterbugs." 

Hoffman's Chocolates was named one of "America's Best Chocolate Shops" by Bon Appetit magazine and was featured in the Wall Street Journal as having the "best overall Easter basket in the nation" March 2000. 

In 2009 Hoffman's Chocolates acquired Good Fortunes, a made-to-order custom fortune cookie company. In 2010 Hoffman's Chocolate also purchased Boca Bons, a premium wholesale brand that features elaborate packaging. As of 2012 the company has made plans to continue to expand its retail locations throughout the South Florida.

In December 2013, Hoffman's Chocolates was purchased by BBX Capital Corporation.

References

Further reading

External links
Official Website
Chocolate Hampers

American chocolate companies
Companies based in Palm Beach County, Florida
Kosher food